One Devonshire Gardens (officially known as Hotel du Vin at One Devonshire Gardens) is a luxury hotel located in the West End of Glasgow, Scotland. The hotel holds a licence as a marriage venue.

History
Devonshire Gardens is a B-listed terrace of five townhouses, constructed in the 1870s. The hotel was opened by Ken McCulloch in 1986 in Number One, although it has since expanded to occupy all five houses, Number Four being the last acquired. The hotel now has forty-nine bedrooms, and in 2006 was acquired by the Hotel du Vin chain, which also operates Malmaison hotels. Celebrity chef Gordon Ramsay ran the hotel's restaurant, Amarylis, until 2004.

Awards
Fine Dining Restaurant of the Year – Scottish Restaurant Awards 2009
Glasgow Hotel of the Year – Scottish Hotel of the Year Awards 2008
Scottish National Hotel Chef of the Year – Scottish Hotel of the Year Awards 2008

See also
Glasgow International Hilton Hotel

References

External links
 

Category B listed buildings in Glasgow
Hotels in Glasgow
Listed hotels in Scotland
Restaurants in Glasgow